Herbert Thomas Appenzeller (September 28, 1925 – January 5, 2018) was an American football coach and college athletics administrator. He served as the head football coach at Guilford College in Greensboro, North Carolina from 1956 to 1962, compiling  a record of 10–50–1. A native of Newark, New Jersey, Appenzeller played college football and ran track at Wake Forest University. He was the head football coach at Chowan College—now known as Chowan University—in Murfreesboro, North Carolina from 1951 to 1955, when the school was a junior college.

Head coaching record

College

References

External links
 

1925 births
2018 deaths
Chowan Hawks football coaches
Guilford Quakers athletic directors
Guilford Quakers football coaches
Wake Forest Demon Deacons football players
Wake Forest Demon Deacons men's track and field athletes
High school basketball coaches in North Carolina
High school football coaches in North Carolina
Junior college football coaches in the United States
Players of American football from Newark, New Jersey
Coaches of American football from New Jersey
Track and field athletes from New Jersey
Basketball coaches from New Jersey